Kaitlyn Schurmann (born 16 November 1998) is an Australian Paralympic road cyclist.

Personal
Schurmann was born on 16 November 1996 with cerebral palsy. She attended Clonard College  in Geelong . In 2019, she is undertaking a Bachelor of International Studies / Bachelor of Commerce student at Deakin University.

Cycling
Schurmann began cycling at the age of 13 after attending a junior try out day at the Geelong Cycling Club. In her debut for the Australian Cycling Team, she won silver medals in the Women Time Trial C1 and Women's Road Race C1 at the UCI Para-cycling Road World Championships in Italy. At the 2019, UCI Para-cycling Road World Championships in Netherlands, she won bronze medals in the Women's Time Trial C1 and Women's Road Race C1.

At the 2022 UCI Para-cycling Road World Championships in Baie-Comeau, she won silver medals in the Women's Time Trial and Road Race C1 events.

She is a member of the Geelong Cycling Club and coached by Loz Shaw.

Recognition
2022 - South Australian Sports Institute Para Athlete of the Year

References

Living people
1998 births
Australian female cyclists
Cyclists from Victoria (Australia)
Paralympic cyclists of Australia
20th-century Australian women
21st-century Australian women